Atul Tandon (born 1 October 1959) is a nonprofit executive, entrepreneur, humanitarian and author.

From the Daryaganj to Wall Street 
Tandon moved to the United States in 1992. He played a role in turning around Citi's West Coast businesses in the mid-90s. His work pioneered customer-centered relationship banking and led to his involvement with Citi's Web 1.0 initiatives. He led corporate-wide sales culture and technology change. During Tandon's tenure as Sr. Vice President and Global Branch Distribution Director at Citibank, the bank grew its global consumer networks to more than 146 million accounts with $5.3 billion in income with a presence in 101 countries.

Humanitarian relief and involvement with World Vision and the ONE Campaign 

Tandon was one of the leading voices behind the Better Safer World campaign, which later joined together with Bono's DATA organization to birth the ONE campaign in the United States seeking to build awareness and enthusiasm among Americans to address issues of global poverty.  In addition, Tandon was a member of World Vision International's executive team providing operational leadership to the international World Vision partnership that runs community development, relief and advocacy projects in nearly 100 countries with 35,000 staff and an annual income of approx. $2.6 billion.

References

Charity fundraisers (people)
Delhi University alumni
1959 births
Living people